Keith Ian Raywood is an American production designer best known as Saturday Night Live (SNL) Art Director since 1985 and its Production Designer since 1990. He has designed music videos and live performances for major recording artists, international and national commercial spots, for MSG & MSG+ networks, and theatre productions both regional and in New York.

Early life and education
Raywood was born in New York City, and lived between there and Miami Beach throughout his childhood. He attended The Dwight School, and studied painting at The Art Students League of New York with Issac Soyer. 

In 1975, while enrolled at Cornell University for painting, he switched to architecture at the end of his freshman year, and then left for London to study at The Architectural Association School of Architecture. While there, he joined the unit that was tutored by renowned architects Bernard Tschumi and Nigel Coates. 

In the spring of 1978, he traveled with a group of students led by Rem Koolhaas to the Soviet Union. Raywood credits his time at The AA as most inspiring and influential in his work, and it would later greatly inform his process, aesthetic, and "architectural" style as a production designer.

In 1979, he returned to Cornell's College of Architecture. While there, he formed the band Symbols, which released two EPs, and regularly performed in New York City clubs like CBGB's, Tramps, Danceteria, and Max's Kansas City.

Career 
Shortly after moving back to New York City in 1982, Raywood became the assistant to Eugene Lee on the film Easy Money. He worked as Lee's  assistant and art director for the next three years on Lee's film, television, and theatre projects, eventually designing his own sets for music videos, commercials, television, and theatre. In 1985, he co-designed, with Lee, the original production of The Normal Heart at The Public Theater.

Raywood became the art director of Saturday Night Live in 1985, and has been credited as one of its production designers since 1990. As of 2022, he has been with show for more than thirty-seven seasons. That same year, he co-designed the Saturday Night Live 40th Anniversary Special. He has collaborated many times with current and former SNL performers and writers on a variety of projects, including Lip Sync Battle, The Tonight Show with Jimmy Fallon, 30 Rock, Late Night with Conan O'Brien, and Tracy Morgan: Black and Blue.

He has designed numerous music specials and television series for MTV, VH1, NBC, HBO, BET, Fuse, Comedy Central, and Spike TV. His credits include The 66th Primetime Emmy Awards; the 1994, 1996, 1997, 1998, 2001, and 2008 MTV Video Music Awards; the 2016 MTV Movie Awards; "The Eagles: Hell Freezes Over"; The American Comedy Awards in 2011,2012 & 2014; VH1's Hip Hop Honors; Don Rickles: One Night Only; Alec Baldwin: One Night Only; Divas Live for VH1; the 2007 Spike TV Video Game Awards; and VH1 Rock Honors: The Who, as well as several of the combined upfront for MTV Networks.

He has designed the Spike Guys' Choice Awards five times.
Other television credits include The Marriage Ref, Russell Simmons Presents Def Poetry & Def Comedy Jam, and The Concert For New York City which broadcast live from Madison Square Garden one month after the September 11, 2001 attacks, for which he received an Emmy nomination.

In 2007, Raywood created several architectural designs for video art installations in collaboration with artist-director-photographer Michael Somoroff. Their first installation, Illumination, opened at the BravinLee gallery.

He designed the studios for the Fuse and MSG networks at 11 Penn Plaza in 2010.

Awards 
Raywood has received 7 Primetime Emmy Awards in the Outstanding Art Direction for a Variety, Music, or Non-fiction Programming category. The first in 2009 for his work on the 2008 MTV Video Music Awards, and the second as part of the art department at Saturday Night Live in 2013, the first time in 38 seasons that SNL had received an Emmy in an Art Direction category. 

In 2012, he also received an Emmy nomination for 30 Rock. In 2010, 2011, 2012, and 2013, he received another four Emmy nominations for Saturday Night Live, totaling seven nominations as part of the show's art department. In 2002, he was nominated in the same category for The Concert for New York City.

Raywood has received two first place Promax Broadcast Design Awards for his work on 2008's and 2012's Spike Guys' Choice Awards.

In 2009, Raywood was nominated for three Art Directors Guild Awards for his 2008 designs of Saturday Night Live, 30 Rock, and the MTV Video Music Awards. He was again nominated by the Guild for 30 Rock and SNL in 2010 and 2011, and received an Award for the Betty White/Jay-Z episode (2010) of SNL in 2011. 

Considering its longevity and influence, this was the first time Saturday Night Live had received a design award of any kind in its then 36 seasons on NBC. In 2012 and 2013, Raywood again won the ADG as part of the SNL team, respectively, for a 2011 episode with Justin Timberlake / Lady Gaga, and the 2012 Season Finale with host and musical guest Mick Jagger. In total, Raywood  has received 5 ADG awards and 22 nominations.

Partial Credit List

References

External links 
 

American production designers
Cornell University College of Architecture, Art, and Planning alumni
Emmy Award winners
Living people
Year of birth missing (living people)